Langenbach is a municipality in the district of Freising in Bavaria in Germany.

The town has its own railway station on the Munich-Regensburg line, and lies on Landesstraße (state road) 2350 between Freising and Moosburg.  Its boroughs are Amperhof, Asenkofen, Großenviecht, Kleinviecht, Niederhummel, Oberbach, Oberhummel, Oftlfing, Rast, Schmidhausen und Windham.

History 
Langenbach was first mentioned in 818. Until its 1803 secularization, the bishopric of Freising was the Langenbach district's most important landowner. Langenbach became an independent municipality in the course of the 1818 Bavarian administrative reforms. The community of Oberhummel was incorporated into Langenbach in 1972.

Local attractions 
Parish church of St. Nicholas of Myra, Langenbach (built 1736)
Parish church of St. Nicholas of Flüe, Langenbach
Church of St. Mary (mid-15th century, Gothic)
"Town Hall," or "Red" Square
Chapel of Kleinviecht (late Romanesque, 1200, with an unusually wide tower)
Church of St. Andrew, Niederhummel (14th century)
Church of St. George and St. Dionysius, Oberhummel

Commerce and Infrastructure

Transport 
Thanks to its location on the Munich–Regensburg line and on Staatsstraße 2350, Langenbach has become a popular commuter suburb.  In 2009 the Langenbach train station received new, elevated platforms and a pedestrian underpass.

Since 1973 Langenbach has been served by the Hallertauer Lokalbahn, which runs from Freising to Langenbach on the Landshut line before diverting in the direction of Hallertau.

Companies with offices in Langenbach 
Kühne + Nagel

Education 
 A primary school

References

External links 

 http://www.gemeinde-langenbach.de/

Freising (district)